Holography is a technique for recording and reconstruction of wavefronts.

Holography and holographic may also refer to:
Holograph, a document written entirely in the handwriting of the person who signed it
Holographic principle, a conjecture of quantum gravity
Holographic weapon sight, non-magnifying gun sight
Windows Holographic, augmented reality computing platform

See also
Hologram (disambiguation)